Søren Kragh Andersen (born 10 August 1994) is a Danish cyclist who currently rides for UCI WorldTeam . He is the younger brother of Asbjørn Kragh Andersen, who was also a professional cyclist, until his retirement in 2022.

Career
He joined  in 2016 on an initial two-year contract. He was named in the startlist for the 2017 Vuelta a España. In July 2018, he was named in the start list for the Tour de France. During the race, Kragh Andersen held the lead of the young rider classification for seven days, ceding the lead on stage 10.

Major results

2011
 1st Stage 4 Trofeo Karlsberg
 2nd Road race, National Junior Road Championships
2012
 10th Road race, UCI Junior Road World Championships
2014
 1st  Time trial, National Under-23 Road Championships
 3rd Himmerland Rundt
 3rd La Côte Picarde
 8th Overall Tour of Taihu Lake
1st  Young rider classification
2015
 1st  Overall ZLM Roompot Tour
1st Stages 1 & 2 (TTT)
 1st Hadeland GP
 Tour de l'Avenir
1st Prologue & Stage 3
 National Under-23 Road Championships
2nd Time trial
3rd Road race
 2nd Overall Tour des Fjords
1st Stage 4
 2nd Ringerike GP
 4th Overall Tour de Berlin
 5th Time trial, National Road Championships
 6th Volta Limburg Classic
 9th Skive–Løbet
 10th Overall Paris–Arras Tour
1st  Mountains classification
2016
 4th Overall Ster ZLM Toer
 6th Overall Tour of Qatar
1st  Young rider classification
2017
 1st  Team time trial, UCI Road World Championships
 1st Stage 3 Tour of Oman
 2nd Paris–Tours
 4th Time trial, National Road Championships
 5th Overall Ster ZLM Toer
2018
 1st Paris–Tours
 1st Stage 6 Tour de Suisse
 2nd  Team time trial, UCI Road World Championships
 7th Overall BinckBank Tour
 8th Overall Tour des Fjords
 Tour de France
Held  after Stages 3–9
2019
 2nd Overall Volta ao Algarve
2020
 Tour de France
1st Stages 14 & 19
 2nd Overall BinckBank Tour
1st Stage 4 (ITT)
 3rd Omloop Het Nieuwsblad
 10th Overall Paris–Nice
1st Stage 4 (ITT)
2021
 6th Overall Danmark Rundt
 9th Milan–San Remo
2022
 4th Overall Danmark Rundt
 5th Gent–Wevelgem
 7th Milan–San Remo
2023
 5th Milan–San Remo
 6th Le Samyn

Grand Tour general classification results timeline

Classics results timeline

References

External links

 

Danish male cyclists
1994 births
Living people
People from Middelfart Municipality
Danish Tour de France stage winners
Sportspeople from the Region of Southern Denmark
Tour de Suisse stage winners